The Icelandic identification number (Icelandic: , abbreviated ) is a unique national identification number used by the Icelandic government to identify individuals and organisations in Iceland, administered by the Registers Iceland. ID numbers are issued to Icelandic citizens at birth, and to foreign nationals resident in Iceland upon registration. They are also issued to corporations and institutions.

Number composition
ID numbers are composed of ten digits. For a personal ID number, the first six of these are the individual's date of birth in the format DDMMYY. The seventh and eighth digits are randomly chosen when the ID number is allocated, ranging from 20 to 99 (with some exceptions). The ninth is a check digit, and the tenth indicates the century of the individual's birth: '9' for 1900–1999, '0' for 2000–2099. ID numbers are often written with a hyphen following the first six digits, e.g. 120174-3399.
D1D2M1M2Y1Y2R1R2PC
D = day, M = Month, Y = year, R = random, P = parity, C = century.

The check digit equation is:

The consequence of this design is that at most 80 people can be born on the same day. The exact same formula is used for the identification numbers of organisations and companies, instead of the date of birth the initial registration date is used and then the number 4 is added to the first digit to makes sure there are no conflicts with individuals.

Use
The system is similar to that employed by some other European countries, but Iceland makes unusually extensive and public use of its ID numbers, with businesses and educational institutions eschewing internal identification numbers in favour of the national system, and its use being mandated in banking transactions. Furthermore, online banking services in Iceland offer a lookup service to check names against numbers. Because of their public nature, ID numbers are not used for authentication. The completeness of the National Register has eliminated the need for the country to conduct a regular census: population statistics can be obtained by simply querying the database.

See also
National identification numbering in Iceland

References

External links

Society of Iceland
National identification numbers